The Pathway is the second album by Officium Triste, released on Displeased Records in 2001.

Track listing
  "Roses on My Grave" – 6:35  
  "Pathway (Of Broken Glass)" – 6:17  
  "Foul Play" – 4:43  
  "Camouflage" – 4:27  
  "Divinity" – 6:31  
  "Deep Down" – 7:27  
  "This Is Goodbye" – 5:56

Personnel
 Pim Blankenstein – vocals
 Johan Kwakernaak – rhythm guitar
 Martin Kwakernaak – drums, keyboards
 Gerard de Jong – lead guitar
 Lawrence Meyer – bass guitar

Officium Triste albums
2001 albums